Yalavadal is a village in Dharwad district of Karnataka, India.

Demographics
As of the 2011 Census of India there were 266 households in Yalavadal and a total population of 1,236 consisting of 632 males and 604 females. There were 151 children ages 0-6.

References

Villages in Dharwad district